Kee Thuan Chye (born 25 May 1954) is a Malaysian actor, dramatist, poet and journalist. Acting in theatre, films, and on television for more than 40 years, he continues to do so. In 1981, Kee co-founded the theatre group, KAMI, in Kuala Lumpur. A noted civil rights activist, he would express in his plays whatever he could not express through the newspapers under Malaysia's repressive Printing Presses and Publications Act (PPPA). For speaking out without fear or favour, Kee was among the first recipients of The Annexe Heroes Freedom of Expression Awards when it was launched in 2008. 

Although social reengineering under the New Economic Policy had already begun after the 13 May Incident of 1969, it became more pronounced after Mahathir bin Mohamad became Prime Minister in 1981. At the New Straits Times, Kee Thuan Chye received numerous memos from his editor-in-chief for trying to push the parameters and opening up public discourse on what was deemed 'sensitive' issues. Firmly believing that the responsibility of a journalist to the public is to inform them of the truth, he had to battle with his superiors and as a consequence, he was often punished, marginalised, and shut out. In 1988, Kee received his master's degree in drama from the University of Essex, after being awarded a British Council Fellowship for postgraduate studies in England.

In 2001, Kee Thuan Chye became an Associate Editor of The Star in Kuala Lumpur, creating and editing the English column,  Mind Our English, until retirement in May 2009. His Sunday Star column, Playing The Fool, which he began in April 2007, ran for only two instalments before it was cancelled. In his inaugural article, Kee had written that he would be speaking out frankly on social and political issues, without fear or favour. His second article, hitting out at racial discrimination in Malaysia, was published but when it came to his third article, the editors got jittery and suppressed it. The Star finally decided to terminate the column after Kee submitted his fourth article.

Civil rights advocacy
Kee Thuan Chye's political awakening began when he could not afford to pursue his master's degree unless he had a tutor's position. He applied for the post at Universiti Sains Malaysia, his alma mater, and although he was the top student in his class, the job was given to someone else. Kee then joined the now-defunct National Echo as literary editor where he created the page Culture Scene and wrote editorials on political and other issues. Moving from Penang to Kuala Lumpur to join the New Straits Times in the late 1970s, he saw more clearly how race had been politicised to divide the people. Mahathir Mohamad who had become the Prime Minister in 1981 was becoming increasingly dictatorial and would tolerate no criticism of him and his government in the media.

What Kee Thuan Chye could not express through the newspaper, he eventually expressed in his plays. 1984 Here and Now which spoke out frankly against Big Brother and institutionalised racial discrimination, played to full houses in 1985, followed, amongst others, by The Big Purge which brazenly satirises Mahathir and Operation Lalang.

In the aftermath of the 2008 general elections, Kee Thuan Chye rushed out his book March 8: The Day Malaysia Woke Up in a record three months, due to the topicality of the subject matter. This was followed by March 8: Time for Real Change in 2010. 

Between 2008 and 2018, Kee wrote a total of 10 books about the Malaysian political scene, as part of his attempts to create awareness among Malaysians of the need for political change and a better Malaysia.

He finally realised the fruits of his struggle at Malaysia’s 14th general election on May 9, 2018, when the seemingly invincible incumbent coalition, Barisan Nasional, was voted out after having held power for 61 years. It was a historic phenomenon that few people expected. But it happened largely because of the efforts put in by Malaysians who wanted change and worked hard to make it come about.

To commemorate this historic event and also pay tribute to the efforts of everyday Malaysians who had endured the oppressive rule of Barisan Nasional for many years and struggled to kick it out, Kee threw himself into writing a thoroughly researched book that captures the drama of their struggle starting from the time of the 13th general election and building up to the climax of the 14th general election. From despair to hope to euphoria. 

He also wrote a narrative entitled The People’s Victory.

Filmography

Films

Television
Kee Thuan Chye has appeared in many television dramas, including:

Plays

Writing and Directing for Theatre

Acting in Theatre

Scriptwriting for television
 2009: Writing storylines for Auntie English, produced by Astro
 2004: Co-writing the script for one episode of Singapore Shakes! with Remesh Panicker, followed by another episode, singly
 1998–1999: Writing storylines for the 150-episode Idaman II
 1997-1998: Writing storylines for the 150-episode Idaman

Published books
 The People's Victory (Marshall Cavendish, 2019)
 Swordfish + Concubine, play-text (Gerakbudaya, 2018)
 You Want This GOONvernment Ah? (Gerakbudaya, 2018)
 Unbelievably Stupid Too! (Gerakbudaya, 2015)
 Unbelievably Stupid! (Gerakbudaya, 2015)
 Can We Save Malaysia, Please! (Marshall Cavendish, 2014)
 We Could **** You, Mr Birch, 20th anniversary republication (Gerakbudaya, 2014)
 The Elections Bullshit (Strategic Information and Research Development Centre, 2013)
 Ask for No Bullshit, Get Some More! (Strategic Information and Research Development Centre, 2013)
 No More Bullshit, Please, We're All Malaysians (Marshall Cavendish, 2012)
 March 8: Time for Real Change (Marshall Cavendish, 2010)
 March 8: The Day Malaysia Woke Up (Marshall Cavendish, 2008)
 1984 Here and Now, play-text and introduction by Helen Gilbert (Marshall Cavendish, 2004)
 The Big Purge, play-text and introduction by Shirley Geok-lin Lim (Marshall Cavendish, 2004)
 We Could **** You, Mr Birch, play-text and introduction by Robert Yeo (Marshall Cavendish, 2004)
 We Could **** You, Mr Birch, play-text and introduction by Robert Yeo (self-published, 1995; reprinted, 1995, 1996, 1998, and 2000)
 We Could **** You, Mr Birch, play-text and theatre programme (self-published, 1994)
 Just In So Many Words, collection of selected writings in the press (Heinemann, 1992; reprinted, 1993)
 Haunting the Tiger and Other Stories, edited (Berita Publishing, 1991)
 Old Doctors Never Fade Away, a biography (Teks Publishing, 1988)
 1984 Here and Now, play text and post-performance reviews (K. Das Ink, 1987)

Other Publications
 Extract from play We Could **** You, Mr Birch included in An Anthology of English Writing from Southeast Asia edited by Rajeev S. Patke, Isabella Banzon, Philip Holden and Lily Rose Tope (National Library Board, Singapore, 2012)
 'The Boy who Saved Singapura' in the anthology Malaysian Tales Retold and Remixed (ZI Publications, 2011)
 'Just Another Empty Slogan?', an essay in the book No Honeymoon: Najib's First 100 Days (Gerakbudaya Enterprise, 2009)
 Ideals and Principles, a 10-minute play, in 10 X 10: 100 Minutes to Change the World (Kakiseni, 2008)
 'Towards the Impossible Dream', an essay in the book Tipping Points (The Edge, 2008)
 Poems, extract from A Sense of Home, and play script of We Could *** You, Mr Birch included in anthology Petals of Hibiscus edited by Mohammad Quayum (Pearson Books, 2003)
 Another extract from A Sense of Home included in the anthology The Merlion and the Hibiscus (Penguin, 2002)
 Extract from screenplay A Long Way from Hollywood included in Silverfish New Writing 2 edited by Satendra Nandan (Silverfishbooks, 2002)
 1984 Here and Now included in Postcolonial Plays - An Anthology edited by Helen Gilbert (Routledge, UK, 2001)
 Extract from a novel in progress entitled A Sense of Home included in the anthology New Writing 10, edited by Penelope Lively and George Szirtes (Picador, UK, 2001)
 Poems included in bilingual anthology of Malaysian poetry Suara Rasa (Maybank, 1993)
 Several poems included in bilingual Anthology of Malaysian Poetry/Antologi Puisi Pelbagai Kaum edited by K.S. Maniam and M.Shanmughalingam (Dewan Bahasa dan Pustaka, 1988)
 Numerous poems published in Malaysian newspapers and journals Masakini and Southeast Asian Review of English, and in magazines and journals abroad - Asiaweek (Hong Kong), Focus, Sands and Coral, Solidarity, Ideya (Philippines), Pacific Quarterly Moana (New Zealand), Ariel (Canada), Kunapipi (Australia).
 Numerous radio plays broadcast over Radio Malaysia.

References

1954 births
Living people
People from Penang
Malaysian people of Chinese descent
Malaysian male writers
Malaysian male actors
Alumni of the University of Essex